Beahan is a surname, and may refer to:

 Brianna Beahan (born 1991), Australian track and field athlete
 Daniel Beahan (born 1984), Australian boxer
 Kate Beahan (born 1974), Australian film actress
 Kermit Beahan (1918–1989), bombardier on the American B-29 Superfortress Bockscar
 Kevin Beahan (1933–2022), Irish Gaelic footballer
 Michael Beahan (1937–2022), 19th President of the Australian Senate
 Virginia Beahan (born 1946), American photographer

See also
 Behan